Andrew McDermott (born 24 March 1977 in Sydney) is a retired Australian professional soccer player.

McDermott spent most of his career in England at West Bromwich Albion. In a three-year spell at the club he made over 50 appearances and scored twice, with strikes against Luton Town in the League Cup and Wolverhampton Wanderers in the league.

References

1977 births
Living people
Australian soccer players
Australian expatriate soccer players
Expatriate footballers in England
Queens Park Rangers F.C. players
West Bromwich Albion F.C. players
Notts County F.C. players
Northern Spirit FC players
Expatriate footballers in Scotland
Scottish Premier League players
Dunfermline Athletic F.C. players
Australian Institute of Sport soccer players
Association football defenders